Stoney Burke is an American Contemporary Western television series broadcast on ABC from October 1, 1962, until May 20, 1963. Jack Lord starred in the title role. Burke is a professional rodeo cowboy who specializes in saddle bronc riding and competes for the Golden Buckle, presented annually to the rodeo world champion in each rodeo event.

Overview
During his quest for the Golden Buckle, Stoney becomes entangled in the lives of numerous people and is accompanied on the rodeo circuit by friends Ves Painter (Warren Oates), Cody Bristol (Robert Dowdell), and E. J. Stocker (Bruce Dern).

Reception
The same year that Stoney Burke premiered, NBC aired its own drama about rodeo performers, Wide Country, starring Earl Holliman and Andrew Prine. It ended after twenty-eight episodes. Both series were Westerns that debuted at the end of the time when Western programs—a fixture of 1950s and early 1960s television—had been a number one draw on the medium. By the mid-1960s, market saturation had begun to take its toll; while established series such as Bonanza and Gunsmoke continued to thrive, new shows with less than robust ratings struggled to survive. Both rodeo series were cancelled after one season.

Guest stars
Dick Clark of American Bandstand was cast as Sgt. Andy Kincaid in the 1963 episode "Kincaid" (one of several backdoor pilots), which also featured real-life rodeo cowboy Casey Tibbs playing himself. James Coburn was cast as Jamison in the 1963 episode "The Test"; J. Pat O'Malley, Richard Eyer, and Ivan Dixon were also featured in this episode.

Episodes

DVD release
On April 16, 2013, Timeless Media Group released Stoney Burke - The Complete Series on DVD in Region 1. The six disc set includes all 32 episodes of the series.

See also
Jack Lord filmography

References

Sources
 McNeil, Alex. Total Television  (1996). New York: Penguin Books 
 Brooks, Tim and Marsh, Earle, The Complete Directory to Prime Time Network and Cable TV Shows (1999). New York: Ballantine Books

External links

1962 American television series debuts
1963 American television series endings
American Broadcasting Company original programming
1960s American drama television series
Black-and-white American television shows
English-language television shows
Television series by United Artists Television
1960s Western (genre) television series